20th Century Masters – The Millennium Collection: The Best of Lynyrd Skynyrd is a compilation album by  Lynyrd Skynyrd, released in 1999 as a part of the modern effort at recapturing the classics and repackaging them for newer generations to be exposed to and enjoy. It compiles some of the band's greatest and most recognizable hits. The album was certified Double Platinum by the RIAA in 2006, and has sold 2,929,000 copies in the U.S. .

Track listing
"Sweet Home Alabama" (Ed King, Gary Rossington, Ronnie Van Zant) - 4:45
"What's Your Name?" (Rossington, Van Zant) - 3:32
"Gimme Three Steps" (Allen Collins, Van Zant) - 4:30
"Double Trouble" (Collins, Van Zant) - 2:50
"You Got That Right" (Steve Gaines, Van Zant) - 3:47
"Saturday Night Special" (King, Van Zant) - 5:09
"That Smell" (Collins, Van Zant) - 5:49
"Swamp Music" (King, Van Zant) - 3:33
"I Ain't the One" (Rossington, Van Zant) - 3:54
"Free Bird" (Collins, Van Zant) - 9:10

Tracks 1 and 8 from Second Helping (1974)
Tracks 2, 5, and 7 from Street Survivors (1977)
Tracks 3 and 9-10 from (Pronounced 'Lĕh-'nérd 'Skin-'nérd) (1973)
Track 4 from Gimme Back My Bullets (1976)
Track 6 from Nuthin' Fancy (1975)

Charts

Weekly charts

Year-end charts

Certifications

References

Lynyrd Skynyrd
Lynyrd Skynyrd compilation albums
1999 greatest hits albums
MCA Records compilation albums